Legion of Boom may refer to:

 Legion of Boom (Seattle Seahawks), a nickname given to the Seattle Seahawks' defense during the 2010s
 Legion of Boom (album), a 2004 album by The Crystal Method